Don't Blow Your Top is the third studio album by German industrial band KMFDM, released on February 12, 1988 by Cash Beat Records.

A remastered version of the album was released on 12 September 2006, featuring new liner notes and photos of the band.

Track listing
All songs written and composed by En Esch and Sascha Konietzko unless otherwise noted.

Vinyl/Cassette release

CD release

Reception
Andy Hinds from Allmusic said that Don't Blow Your Top "sounds a little flimsy when compared to the band's pile-driving later work", and that it sounds "like a combination of early Meat Beat Manifesto, Twitch-era Ministry, and even...the more primitive stuff of Alien Sex Fiend."

Personnel
Sascha Konietzko – bass, vocals, guitars, synths, programming
En Esch – vocals, guitars, drums, programming
Raymond Watts – vocals, programming ("No Meat—No Man", "Don't Blow Your Top", "Disgust")
Jr. Blackmale – vocals ("King Kong Dub (Rubber Mix)")
Sigrid Meyer – vocals ("Don't Blow Your Top", "Disgust", "Oh Shit")

References

External links
 KMFDM DØTKØM Don't Blow Your Top lyrics at the official KMFDM website

1988 albums
KMFDM albums
TVT Records albums
Wax Trax! Records albums
Metropolis Records albums